Nina Vale was an American actress and dancer, who had three leading roles in films of the 1940s, but stopped acting for unknown reasons.

Early years
Vale was born in Boston as Anne Hunter. Because her parents objected to her desire to become an actress, she left home in her teenage years and went to New York City.

Stage
Vale was a dramatics student of Benno Schneider in New York. Her work on stage there included acting in The Women. Later, she played a Russian sniper in a road-show production of Doughgirls. In 1948, she was in Joy to the World in New Haven, Connecticut. In 1949, she co-starred in a production of the comedy Reunion in Vienna.

In 1959, she was billed as Anne Hunter in a performance of Passion, Poison, and Petrifaction.

Film
Vale's first film was The Gay Falcon for RKO Pictures.

Dance
In New York, Vale danced in The Girl from Wyoming and was featured in a New Faces revue. She also danced in a Los Angeles production of the operetta Bittersweet.

Filmography

References

External links 

 

American film actresses
20th-century American actresses
Year of birth missing
Possibly living people